Mirko Savone is an Italian voice-over actor born in Frosinone, Italy in 1985.

Best known in Italy for giving his voice to Christian Bale, Elijah Wood, and many TV series and cartoons for The Disney Channel, Nickelodeon and other National Channels. He has directed movies and TV series for The Disney Channel, RAI and Mediaset. From year 1996 to year 2000 he was the official voice of "The Disney Channel". He started acting in theater at age 6 and worked in almost every sector of show business. At age 18 he became part of the cast of the famous TV show “Macao” in Italy (RAI 2). One of his most famous works is “Germania 99” written and directed by Gigliola Scola (wife of Oscar Winner Ettore Scola).

He graduated in music from The Conservatory “Licino Refice” (FR, Italy) in piano and voice when he was 17 years old.

In late 2000, he moved to New York City where he studied at the Lee Strasberg Theatre and Film Institute. He worked in the Off-Broadway play “Crossing Rockaway Parkway” in New York City with Jonathan Chase and Brooklyn Sudano (daughter of Donna Summer).

He speaks four languages (Italian, English, Spanish, and Turkish) and is a graduate Columbia University in the City of New York. He currently works at Pfizer as an Epidemiologist.

References

External links
The Italian Voice-Overs Database - Mirko Savone

20th-century Italian male actors
21st-century American male actors
Living people
Year of birth missing (living people)